The 1950 Albanian National Championship was the thirteenth season of the Albanian National Championship, the top professional league for association football clubs, since its establishment in 1930.

Overview
It was contested by 12 teams, and Dinamo Tirana won the championship.

League standings

Note: 'Shkodra' is Vllaznia, 'Kavaja' is Besa, 'Lezha' is Besëlidhja, 'Vlora' is Flamurtari, 'Korça' is Skënderbeu, 'Durrësi' is Teuta, 'Tirana' is SK Tirana, 'Fieri' is Apolonia and 'Spartak Pogradeci' is Pogradeci

Results

First round

Second round

Top 6

Bottom 6

References
Albania - List of final tables (RSSSF)

Kategoria Superiore seasons
1
Albania
Albania